Gallipoli is a railway station in Gallipoli, Apulia, Italy. The station is located on the Zollino-Gallipoli railway and Gallipoli-Casarano railway. The train services and the railway infrastructure are operated by Ferrovie del Sud Est.

Train services
The station is served by the following service(s):

Local services (Treno regionale) Lecce - Zollino - Nardo - Gallipoli
Local services (Treno regionale) Casarano - Gallipoli

References

Railway stations in Apulia
Buildings and structures in the Province of Lecce